Christos Mandas (born 17 September 2001) is a Greek professional footballer who plays as a goalkeeper for Super League club OFI.

Career

Atromitos
On 28 November 2017, Mandas made his professional debut in Greek Cup against Sparta. On 30 September 2019, he signed a contract extension until the summer of 2022, with a buy-out clause of €2,000,000.

OFI
On 31 January 2022, OFI officially announced the signing of Mandas, until the summer of 2026.

Career statistics

Club

References

2001 births
Living people
Greek footballers
Greece under-21 international footballers
Greece youth international footballers
Super League Greece players
Atromitos F.C. players
OFI Crete F.C. players
Association football goalkeepers
Footballers from Piraeus